Fanti is an Italian surname. Notable people with this name include:
Bartolomeo Fanti (1428–1495), beatified Italian Carmelite priest
Fausto Fanti (1978–2014), Brazilian actor, comedian and musician
Franco Fanti (1924–2007), Italian Olympic cyclist
Gabriele Fanti (born 2000), Italian footballer
Gaetano Fanti (1687–1759), Italian fresco painter
Guido Fanti (1925–2012), Italian politician
Manfredo Fanti (1806–1865), Italian general
Maria Pia Fanti (born 1957), Italian control theorist
Nick Fanti (born 1996), American baseball player
Ryan Fanti (born 1999), Canadian ice hockey player
Silvio Fanti (1919–1997), Swiss psychiatrist

A variant of this name, DeFanti, is the surname of:
Paul DeFanti, fictional recipient of the Ig Nobel Prize
Thomas A. DeFanti (born 1948), American computer graphics researcher

See also
Afroarabiella fanti, an African moth
Fante (disambiguation)
Fanti drongo, an African bird
Fanti saw-wing, an African bird in the swallow family